is a Japanese football player for Tochigi Uva FC.

Club statistics
Updated to 23 February 2018.

References

External links

Profile at Tochigi SC

1992 births
Living people
Association football people from Osaka Prefecture
Japanese footballers
J2 League players
J3 League players
Japan Football League players
Tokyo Verdy players
Briobecca Urayasu players
Tochigi SC players
Vanraure Hachinohe players
Tochigi City FC players
Association football forwards